Navelwort is a common name for two different plant genera:-
 Omphalodes
 Umbilicus